Ch'akiqucha (Quechua ch'aki dry, qucha lake, "dry lake", hispanicized spelling Chaquicocha) is a mountain in the Andes of Peru which reaches an altitude of approximately . It is located in the Lima Region, Canta Province, San Buenaventura District. Ch'akiqucha lies at the Chillón River northwest of the town of Canta.

References

Mountains of Peru
Mountains of Lima Region